Oni is a progressive metal band formed in Canada by singer Jake Oni.

History
ONI formed in 2014. They released their debut album, Ironshore, in 2016, on Black Light Media Records and Metal Blade Records. Longtime Lamb of God producer Josh Wilbur produced and mixed the album and the song "The Only Cure" featured Lamb of God frontman Randy Blythe.

Wilbur produced Oni's Alone EP, released by Blacklight Media/Metal Blade in 2019. The same year, Jake Oni contributed guest vocals to Lamb of God guitarist Mark Morton's solo album, Anesthetic. He appeared on the song "The Never," alongside Chuck Billy, David Ellefson, and Roy Mayorga, and is credited as cowriter on "Cross Off," featuring late Linkin Park vocalist Chester Bennington.

Morton and Wilbur co-wrote and produced "The Lie," released by Oni in February 2022, with Jake credited as the only member of the band. American trap metal duo City Morgue appeared on another song called "War Ender", with a music video being released on April 13.

On April 28, 2022, Oni announced their second album, Loathing Light, which was released on June 17. The band also released a music video for the new song "Secrets", which features Iggy Pop and Randy Blythe from Lamb of God.

ONI has toured with Gojira, Max & Iggor Cavalera, The Devin Townsend Project, Death Angel, and Children of Bodom. They also performed at Ozzfest Meets Knotfest with Randy Blythe.

Discography
Studio albums
Ironshore (2016)
Loathing Light (2022)

EPs
Alone (2019)

Singles
"Eternal Recurrence" (2016)
"Alone" (2019)
"The Lie" (2022)
"War Ender" (2022)
"Secrets" (2022)

References

Metal Blade Records artists
Canadian progressive metal musical groups